Elwood Staffing is a privately owned corporation offering services in temporary staffing, temporary-to-hire staffing, contract staffing, direct placement staffing, and payrolling services. Headquartered in Columbus, Indiana, Elwood Staffing operates offices throughout the United States. Elwood's services match job seekers with employment in the following areas: manufacturing & production, warehouse & distribution, automotive, engineering, oil & gas, construction, information technology, skilled trades, administrative & clerical, and customer service.

History 
In 1980, David L. Elwood, Ph.D., founded Elwood Consulting, a provider of pre-employment testing services, as a way of supplementing the income of his private practice in psychology in Columbus, Indiana. In the early 1990s, based on client request, the company's service offerings were expanded to offer a full range of temporary staffing services. By 1996, the company reached $1 million in sales, and the following year a new brand name—Elwood Staffing—was selected to more accurately reflect the business' primary activities. Since 2001, Elwood Staffing has acquired numerous companies, including the 2013 acquisition of SOS Employment Group, which doubled its staff size and service footprint. As of early 2022, Elwood employs nearly 1,000 permanent, full-time employees, operates 195 branches and 80 on-site locations, and generates approximately $900 million in annual revenue. 
 
Elwood is the nation's 11th largest industrial staffing firm and the 23rd largest overall staffing firm operating in the country. In terms of individuals and companies served, Elwood's size equates to employment of nearly 29,000 temporary associates daily and staffing partnerships with more than 6,000 client companies annually.

Divisions
Elwood Staffing is divided into three business lines: Elwood Staffing, Elwood Professional, and Skill Staff. 
 
Elwood Staffing 
Elwood Staffing offers temporary, temporary-to-hire, contract, and direct hire positions in a variety of areas: administrative & clerical, customer service, manufacturing & production, and warehouse & distribution.

Elwood Professional
Elwood Professional is the division of Elwood Staffing for to the recruitment and placement of engineering, information technology, and business management professionals in mid-level, VP, and executive openings.

Skill Staff 
Skill Staff is the division of Elwood Staffing that provides contingent workers for the construction and manufacturing trades.

References

Business services companies established in 1980
Temporary employment agencies
Employment agencies of the United States